Sec-1, SEC-1, sec-1, or sec−1 may refer to:

 sec x−1 = sec(x)−1 = exsec(x) or exsecant of x, an old trigonometric function
 sec−1y = sec−1(y), sometimes interpreted as arcsec(y) or arcsecant of y, the compositional inverse of the trigonometric function secant (see below for ambiguity)
 sec−1x = sec−1(x), sometimes interpreted as (sec(x))−1 =  = cos(x) or cosine of x, the multiplicative inverse (or reciprocal) of the trigonometric function secant (see above for ambiguity)
 sec x−1, sometimes interpreted as sec(x−1) = sec(), the secant of the multiplicative inverse (or reciprocal) of x (see below for ambiguity)
 sec x−1, sometimes interpreted as (sec(x))−1 =  = cos(x) or cosine of x, the multiplicative inverse (or reciprocal) of the trigonometric function secant (see above for ambiguity)

See also
Second (time)
Second (angle)
Second (arc)
Arcsec (disambiguation)
Inverse function
cos−1 (disambiguation)
csc−1 (disambiguation)